Wrong End of the Rainbow is the 1970 album from pioneer Folk rock musician Tom Rush. The music on this album, his second in 1970, tends to lean more toward the country rock style. The album was on the Billboard 200 chart for nine weeks and charted as high as #110 on January 30, 1971.

Track listing 
"Wrong End of the Rainbow" (Tom Rush, Trevor Veitch) – 2:48
"Biloxi" (Jesse Winchester) – 4:40
"Merrimack County" (Tom Rush, Trevor Veitch) – 2:50
"Riding on a Railroad"  (James Taylor) – 5:47
"Paddy West" (Arranged and adapted by Tom Rush) – :19
"Came to See Me Yesterday in the Merry Month of" (Ray O'Sullivan) – 1:43
"Starlight" (Tom Rush) – 4:38
"Sweet Baby James" (James Taylor) – 3:16
"Rotunda" (Tom Rush, Trevor Veitch) – 3:22
"Jazzman" (Edward Mark Holstein) – 2:33
"Gnostic Serenade" (William Hawkins) – 4:52

Personnel

Musicians
 Tom Rush – guitar, vocals
 Trevor Veitch – acoustic guitar, electric guitar, dobro, mandocello, dulcimer, vocals
 David Bromberg – pedal steel guitar
 Paul Armin – violin, viola
 Bob Boucher – bass
 John Locke – organ, piano (tracks 1, 7)
 Erik Robertson – organ, piano (all tracks except 1, 7)
 Brent Titcomb – harmonica
 Dave Lewis – drums, percussion

Technical
 David Briggs – producer
 Jim Reeves – engineer
 Ed Freeman – arranger
 Bob Cato – photography, design

References

Tom Rush albums
1970 albums
Albums produced by David Briggs (producer)
Columbia Records albums